Cat on a Hot Tin Roof is a 1984 American made-for-television drama film directed by Jack Hofsiss, and starring Jessica Lange, Tommy Lee Jones, Rip Torn, Kim Stanley, David Dukes, and Penny Fuller. The film was written by Tennessee Williams, produced by American Playhouse, and originally premiered on Showtime on August 19, 1984.

Plot 
This adaptation revived the sexual innuendos which had been muted in the 1958 film. The script is the substantially revised and restored version that Williams made for the 1974 Broadway revival, including the ending, which suggests that the protagonists' future together is anything but certain.

Cast
 Jessica Lange as Margaret "Maggie" Pollitt
 Tommy Lee Jones as Brick Pollitt
 Rip Torn as Harvey "Big Daddy" Pollitt
 Kim Stanley as Ida "Big Mama" Pollitt
 Penny Fuller as Mae Flynn Pollitt
 David Dukes as Cooper "Gooper" Pollitt
 Macon McCalman as Reverend Tooker
 Thomas Hill as Dr. Baugh
 Fran Bennett as Sookey
 Ami Foster as Polly Pollitt

Awards and nominations 
Both Stanley and Fuller were nominated for the Emmy Award for Outstanding Supporting Actress in a Miniseries or Special, and Stanley went on to win. It was a re-union of sorts for Stanley and Lange, who received Oscar nominations for playing mother and daughter in 1982's Frances.  The film was also nominated for the Primetime Emmy Award for Outstanding Lighting Design / Lighting Direction for a Variety Special.

The film was also nominated for five CableACE Awards, specifically, Actor in a Theatrical or Dramatic Special (Rip Torn), Art Direction on Video Tape (John Retsek, David Jenkins, Showtime Networks), Theatrical Special (Lou LaMonte, Phylis Geller, Showtime Networks), Writing a Theatrical or Dramatic Special (Tennessee Williams, Showtime Networks), and Lighting Direction on Video Tape (Danny Franks, Ken Dettling, Showtime Networks).

References

External links 
 
 https://www.imdb.com/title/tt0088888/awards?ref_=tt_awd on IMDb
 
 

1984 television films
1984 films
1984 drama films
American films based on plays
Films about alcoholism
Films about cancer
Films about dysfunctional families
Films about grieving
Films set in Mississippi
Films based on works by Tennessee Williams
Showtime (TV network) films
American Playhouse
American drama television films
1980s English-language films
1980s American films
English-language drama films